Orosius is a genus of leafhopper in the tribe Opsiini and the subfamily Deltocephalinae. The genus was revised by Ghauri in 1966. Species can be differentiated by the shape of the aedeagus.

Species
There are seven known species including:
 Orosius albicinctus Distant: type species  
 Orosius canberrensis (Evans, 1938), Australia
 Orosius lotophagorum (Kirkaldy, 1907), Australia
 Orosius orientalis (Evans, 1938), the common brown leafhopper, Australia

References

External links
 Orosius on www1.dpi.nsw.gov.au

Cicadellidae genera
Opsiini